Loimaa (historical ) is a town and municipality of Finland.

It is located in the province of Western Finland and is part of the Southwest Finland region.

Loimaa's neighboring municipalities are Huittinen, Humppila, Koski Tl, Marttila, Oripää, Punkalaidun, Pöytyä, Somero, Säkylä and Ypäjä.

History 
First mentions of Loimaa come from the year 1439 but a parish was founded in the area already a decade earlier. The town was founded in its current form in 1876 as the railway between Turku and Toijala was completed.

A legend of Prättäkitti is heavily associated with Loimaa.

The town of Loimaa merged with Loimaan kunta (literally "Municipality of Loimaa") on January 1, 2005 and with the municipalities of Alastaro and Mellilä on January 1, 2009.

The name Loimaa comes from the river Loimijoki which flows through the town.

Politics 
After the 2021 municipal election the municipal council of Loimaa is as follows:

* The National Coalition Party and Christian Democrats formed an electoral alliance for the election.

Culture 

Rompepäivät (lit. "junk days") is an annual event that takes place in August. It brings together trunk show enthusiasts selling both old and new merchandise as well as food and entertainment. The trunk show is located at the historic market square of Loimaa, now known as Peltoinen, and draws in 8,000–10,000 visitors.

The local newspaper is called Loimaan Lehti. It first started publishing in 1915 and today comes out three times a week: Tuesdays, Thursdays and Saturdays.

Subdivisions and villages
Alastaron-Mäenpää, Eura, Haara, Haaroinen, Haitula, Hartoinen, Hattula, Hirvikoski, Hurskala, Ilmarinen, Inkilä, Joenperä, Juva, Karhula, Karsattila, Kartanonmäki, Kauhanoja, Kemppilä, Kesärlä, Klockarla, Koenperä, Kojonkulma, Krekilä, Kuninkainen, Kurittula, Kuttila, Köyliö, Lappijoki, Levälä, Lähde, Metsämaa, Mäenpää, Niemi, Niinijoki, Onkijoki, Pahikainen, Pappinen, Peltoinen, Piltola, Puujalkala, Raikkola, Seppälä, Sieppala, Suopelto, Torkkala, Vesikoski, and Vilvainen.

Sights

Alpo Jaakola Statue Park
Heikintalo bison farm
The church of Loimaa Proper
Loimaa regional museum
Mill of Krekilä
Sarka, The Finnish Museum of Agriculture
Mill of Vesikoski
Loimaa railway station

Sports
The city is home to the Bisons Loimaa basketball club, 2012 and 2013 Champion of the Korisliiga. The club regularly qualifies for international competitions. It plays its home games at the Loimaa Sports Center and on some occasions moves to the Energia Areena. The city is also home to the Hurrikaani Loimaa volleyball club, regularly qualifies for international competitions such as CLvolleyM and SM-league.

Religion 

The most popular religion among the inhabitants is the Evangelical Lutheranism: 4/5 of the local population is a member of the Loimaa Congregation, this has existed since 1420's. In total there are six lutheran churches scattered around the municipality's area. 

The following Christian revival movements inside Lutheranism are represented in Loimaa:

 Forssa-Loimaan Rauhanyhdistys (Conservative Laestadianism): based in Loimaa.
 The Lutheran Evangelical Association of Finland (evangelical movement)
 Hyvän Paimenen luterilainen seurakunta (Evangelical Lutheran Mission Diocese of Finland): founded in Loimaa in 2016.

Other Christian denominations are Pentecostalists who are represented by a local association (Finnish Elävät Virrat ry) since 2018. The Evangelical Free Church of Finland has an office in Loimaa, although it's managed from Forssa. Inside the Finnish Orthodox Church Loimaa belongs to the congregation of Turku and an Orthodox mass is held regularly in Loimaa.

Apart from Christian denominations, Loimaa also hosts a Kingdom Hall of the Jehovah's Witnesses. There's also a Buddhist meditation center (Mahayana and Vajrayana) ran by the Buddhist Dharma Center in its Tibet Art Center, which has bee a registered as a religious association since 1998.

Notable people
Alpo Jaakola
Aimo Koivunen
Reino Kuuskoski
Nicolaus Rungius
Olavi Ala-Nissilä
Mauno Kurppa
Arto Savonen
Mato Valtonen

International relations

Twin towns — sister cities
Loimaa is twinned with the following towns.

  Uddevalla, Sweden 
  Skien, Norway 
  Jõhvi, Estonia 
  Staraya Russa, Russia 
  Mosfellsbær, Iceland 
  Thisted Municipality, Denmark

Loimaa, Skien, Uddevalla, Thisted and Mostfellsbær form the oldest Nordic network of twin towns, which is still active.

References

External links

Town of Loimaa – Official website

 
Cities and towns in Finland
Populated places established in 1921